Alisdair Macdonald (1940-2007) was a British press photographer who worked 26 years with the Daily Mirror. He took a seven year break to help launch the first full colour national newspaper Today. 

In 1963 Alisdair travelled with The Beatles to Paris to document their shows at the Olympic Theatre. He would regularly photograph the band up to, and beyond their break up in 1970. 

In 1989 he won first place in the Humour category of the World Press Photo contest for his photograph of a workman leaving the scene of a burst water main. 

After his death, his daughter Helen Macdonald adopted a goshawk to help her cope and later wrote a book about the experience.

References

Daily Mirror people
1940 births
2007 deaths